Gold is Sister Sparrow's fourth studio album, released on October 12, 2018 on Thirty Tigers. The album came after the band took a break while the lead singer, Arleigh Kincheloe, had a son in 2017.

Track list

Personnel

Musicians
 Arleigh Kincheloe – vocals
 Carter Matschullat - piano, organ, keyboards, bass, guitar, percussion, optigan, mellotron, drums, 
 Jackson Kincheloe - harmonica, lap steel guitar
 Caito Sanchez - drums
 Dan Boyden - drums
 Josh Myers - bass
 Chris McLaughlin - guitar
 Coyle Girelli - guitar
 Eren Cannata - guitar
 Oliver Patrice Weder - piano, 
 Morgan Wiley - piano, clarinet
 Phil Rodriguez - trumpet
 Brian Graham - baritone saxophone, tenor saxophone
 Sizzy Rocket - background vocals
 Tyler James Bellinger - background vocals

Production
 Carter Matschullat – producer, engineer
 Chris McLaughlin - engineer
 Areil Borujow - 
 Steve Wall - , additional engineering
 David Mohacsi - 
 Mark Santangelo - 
 Jimmy Gnecco - 
 Danny Boyden - 
 Adam McHeffey Creatives – liner layout
 Kevin Condon – photography

References

2018 albums
Sister Sparrow & the Dirty Birds albums